St. Joseph is a town in St. Croix County, Wisconsin, United States. The population was 3,842 at the 2010 census. The unincorporated communities of Burkhardt, and Houlton are located in the town.

Geography

Demographics

2010 census
As of the census of 2010, there were 3842 people, 1388 households, and 1136 families living in the town. The racial makeup of the town was 96.1% White, 2.6% from other races, and 1.3% from two or more races. Hispanic or Latino of any race were 2.4% of the population.

There were 1388 households, out of which 35.4% had children under the age of 18 living with them, 72.4% were married couples living together, 5.4% had a female householder with no husband present, 4.0% had a male householder with no wife present, and 18.2% were non-families. 13.5% of all households were made up of individuals, and 4.2% had someone living alone who was 65 years of age or older. The average household size was 2.74 and the average family size was 3.00.

The median age in the town was 42.9 years. 24.9% of residents were under the age of 18; 5.5% were between the ages of 18 and 24; 23.5% were from 25 to 44; 36.2% were from 45 to 64; and 9.9% were 65 years of age or older. The gender makeup of the town was 51.6% male and 48.4% female.

The median household income in the town was $84,769; the per capita income was $40,466. About 5.7% of families and 8.9% of the population were below the poverty line, including 12.8% of those below the age of eighteen, but no persons over the age of sixty-five.

2000 census
As of the census of 2000, there were 3,436 people, 1,193 households, and 979 families living in the town. The racial makeup of the town was 97.93% White, 0.26% African American, 0.26% Native American, 0.61% Asian, 0.15% Pacific Islander, 0.23% from other races, and 0.55% from two or more races. Hispanic or Latino of any race were 0.76% of the population.

There were 1,193 households, out of which 41.5% had children under the age of 18 living with them, 74.0% were married couples living together, 4.7% had a female householder with no husband present, and 17.9% were non-families. 13.4% of all households were made up of individuals, and 2.6% had someone living alone who was 65 years of age or older. The average household size was 2.86 and the average family size was 3.15.

In the town, the population was spread out, with 27.8% under the age of 18, 4.9% from 18 to 24, 33.7% from 25 to 44, 26.0% from 45 to 64, and 6.1% who were 65 years of age or older. The median age was 37 years. For every 100 females, there were 111.4 males. For every 100 females age 18 and over, there were 107.6 males.

The median income for a household in the town was $81,277, and the median income for a family was $80,606. Males had a median income of $52,813 versus $32,283 for females. The per capita income for the town was $30,988. About 0.3% of families and 1.4% of the population were below the poverty line, including none of those under the age of eighteen or sixty-five or over.

References

External links
Town of St. Joseph, Wisconsin website

Towns in St. Croix County, Wisconsin
Towns in Wisconsin